Rahava is a village in Belarus. It is located in the Minsk District of Minsk Region, 30 km north of the capital Minsk.

History
Greek-Catholic church of St. George was built here in 1814 by landowner Wołodkowicz.

Parishioners-Uniates converted to Orthodoxy in 1839, since 1868 has been a transition of Catholics.

Newer stone church of St. Constantine and Elena, built at government expense, was consecrated on 8 September 1869.

References

External links 
 Location including the places

Villages in Belarus
Populated places in Minsk Region
Minsk District